Anthony Langston  was an English politician who sat in the House of Commons at various times between 1614 and 1626. He supported the Royalist cause in the English Civil War.

Langston was the  son of Henry Langston of Sedgeberrow, Littleton. He was appointed with John Izod by Lord Cecil to be Steward of King's Norton in February 1604. In 1614, he was elected Member of Parliament for Evesham. He was re-elected MP for Evesham in 1621, 1625 and 1626.

Langston supported the King in the Civil War and was elected an Honorary Freeman of Worcester in 1643. He was taken prisoner at the end of the Siege of Worcester when the city surrendered on 19 July 1646. On 21 December 1646 he begged to compound on Oxford articles for delinquency, and for leave to attend and perfect his composition.

References

Year of birth missing
Year of death missing
Cavaliers
People from Evesham
Place of birth missing
English MPs 1614
English MPs 1621–1622
English MPs 1625
English MPs 1626